The News Media Alliance (formerly known as the Newspaper Association of America until 2016) is a trade association representing approximately 2000 newspapers in the United States and Canada. Member newspapers represented by the Alliance include large daily papers, non-daily and small-market publications, as well as digital and multiplatform products. The organization has organized and hosted mediaXchange, the newspaper industry's annual conference.

Overview
Headquartered in Arlington, Virginia, just outside Washington, D.C., the News Media Alliance focuses on the foremost issues shaping the newspaper industry today. Among the association's top priorities are public policy and legal matters, as well as revenue and audience development for the broad range of products and digital platforms now offered by the newspaper industry.

History
On June 1, 1992, seven newspaper-industry associations merged to create the Newspaper Association of America. The associations included the American Newspaper Publishers Association (founded in 1887), the Newspaper Advertising Bureau, the Association of Newspaper Classified Advertising Managers, the International Circulation Managers Association, the International Newspapers Advertising and Marketing Executives, the Newspaper Advertising Co-op Network, and the Newspaper Research Council.

In 2016, the Newspaper Association of America changed its name to the News Media Alliance. After this change the Alliance no longer required that members produce a printed paper, with the organization now also accepting digital news sites as members. However, all members must still produce original journalism.

In July 2017, the News Media Alliance announced they were trying to get a limited antitrust exemption from Congress, to let them negotiate collectively with internet companies. In June 2019, in an apparent effort to promote this bill, now named the "Journalism Competition and Preservation Act", it published a report estimating that in 2018, Google had made around $4.7 billion from news content. The NMA's head David Chavern argued that part of that sum should be shared with the news industry. As summarized by the Columbia Journalism Review, the accuracy of the NMA's claims was widely questioned, with "a number of prominent journalists and media-industry observers [scoffing] at both the number and the report itself". The Nieman Journalism Lab criticized the NMA's report as "based on math reasoning that would be embarrassing from a bright middle schooler".

In July 2022, the News Media Alliance and MPA – The Association of Magazine Media have merged to create the News/Media Alliance, "a nonprofit organization representing more than 2,000 news and magazine media organizations and their multiplatform businesses in the United States and globally."

Organization
The Alliance previously partnered with the Newspaper National Network (now closed), a print and online advertising sales partnership, and the NAA Foundation, which emphasizes youth readership and the cultivation of a more diverse media work force.

The Alliance is a member of the World Association of Newspapers and News Publishers, the World Press Freedom Committee and the International Press Telecommunications Council.

See also
 Newspaper National Network

References

External links
 News Media Alliance official website
 NNN Official Website

Trade associations based in the United States
Newspaper associations
Organizations established in 1992
Lobbying organizations in the United States